John Gerich (b. 1947) was a politician in Saskatchewan, Canada, MLA for Redberry, and former member of the Royal Canadian Mounted Police.  He served as Associate Minister of Economic Development in the Saskatchewan Progressive Conservative government led by Grant Devine.

Gerich was involved in the biggest political corruption scandal in Saskatchewan history, in which dummy companies provided receipts for false expense claims. Gerich was convicted of fraud in 1997 for taking money illegally from his MLA communications allowance.  He was sentenced to 2 years in jail and fined CDN $12,000.

After his release he worked as a truck driver in the Alberta oilpatch.

References

1947 births
Living people
Members of the Executive Council of Saskatchewan
Progressive Conservative Party of Saskatchewan MLAs
Canadian politicians convicted of fraud
Corruption in Canada